Her Father's Silent Partner is a 1914 American drama film featuring Harry Carey.

Cast
 Harry Carey
 Claire McDowell
 Dorothy Gish
 Lionel Barrymore

See also
 Harry Carey filmography
 Lionel Barrymore filmography

External links

1914 films
American silent short films
American black-and-white films
1914 drama films
Films directed by Donald Crisp
1914 short films
Silent American drama films
1914 directorial debut films
1910s American films